The 2005 NCAA National Collegiate Women's Ice Hockey Tournament involved eight schools playing in single-elimination play to determine the national champion of women's NCAA Division I college ice hockey. The tournament began on March 18, 2005, and ended with the championship game on March 27.

The 2005 tournament was the first to feature eight teams.  The highest four seeds were invited to host first round competition for the right to advance to the Frozen Four.  The expanded field also allowed for the creation of auto-bids for each of the four conferences in Division I women's hockey at the time.

The 2005 tournament was also the last to feature a consolation game.  From 2006 forward, both teams losing semi-final games were awarded third place.

Qualifying teams
The at-large bids, along with the seeding for each team in the tournament, were announced on Sunday, March 13.

Brackets

Note: * denotes overtime period(s)

Note: The team in italics is the home team in the first round.

All-Tournament Team
G: Ali Boe, Harvard
D: Lyndsay Wall, Minnesota
D: Caitlin Cahow, Harvard
F: Sarah Vaillancourt, Harvard
F: Krissy Wendell, Minnesota
F: Natalie Darwitz, Minnesota*
* Most Outstanding Player(s)

References

External links
NCAA Women's Ice Hockey - NCAA.com

NCAA Women's Ice Hockey Tournament
Ice hockey in New Hampshire
2005 in sports in New Hampshire